Edwin Vincent Byrne (August 9, 1891 – July 26, 1963) was an American prelate of the Roman Catholic Church. He served in Puerto Rico, as Bishop of Ponce (1925–1929) and Bishop of San Juan (1929–1943), before returning to the United States as Archbishop of Santa Fe (1943–1963).

Biography
Edwin Byrne was born in Philadelphia, Pennsylvania, to Francis Charles and Anna (née Carroll) Byrne. After graduating from Roman Catholic High School for Boys in Philadelphia in 1908, he studied at St. Charles Borromeo Seminary in Overbrook. He was ordained to the priesthood by Archbishop Edmond Francis Prendergast on May 22, 1915. He then served as a curate at Our Lady of Lourdes Church in Philadelphia until 1917, when he became a chaplain in the United States Navy during World War I. From 1920 to 1923, he was secretary to Bishop James Paul McCloskey, of the Diocese of Jaro in the Philippines. He was named vicar general of Jaro in 1923.

On June 23, 1925, Byrne was appointed the first Bishop of the Diocese of Ponce in Puerto Rico by Pope Pius XI. He received his episcopal consecration on the following November 30 from Cardinal Dennis Joseph Dougherty, with Bishop John Joseph Swint and Bishop Andrew James Louis Brennan serving as co-consecrators. After Archbishop Jorge José Caruana was made Apostolic Nuncio to Mexico, Byrne was named Bishop of San Juan on March 8, 1929. He became an assistant at the Pontifical Throne in 1940.

Byrne was appointed the eighth Archbishop of Santa Fe, New Mexico, on June 12, 1943. During his 20-year-long tenure, he was instrumental in the construction of many churches and schools, and built up the diocesan clergy. In 1958, his decree that no Catholic girl should appear in a bathing suit in the Miss New Mexico pageant received national attention and stirred controversy; he never rescinded the ban. He condemned a "right to work" bill being considered in the state legislature. He also prohibited Catholic students from dating while attending high school, describing "going steady, keeping steady company, necking and kissing" as "pagan" practices. He attended the first session of the Second Vatican Council in 1962.

Byrne suffered a gallbladder attack on July 21, 1963, and was admitted to St. Vincent Hospital two days later. He underwent surgery for removal of the gallbladder on July 26, dying later that day. He was buried at Cathedral Basilica of Saint Francis of Assisi in Santa Fe, New Mexico.

References

External links and additional sources
 (for Chronology of Bishops) 
 (for Chronology of Bishops) 

1891 births
1963 deaths
Clergy from Philadelphia
Participants in the Second Vatican Council
St. Charles Borromeo Seminary alumni
World War I chaplains
United States Navy chaplains
20th-century Roman Catholic archbishops in the United States
Roman Catholic archbishops of Santa Fe
20th-century Roman Catholic bishops in Puerto Rico
Roman Catholic bishops of San Juan de Puerto Rico
Roman Catholic bishops of Ponce